Echinarachnius  is a genus of sand dollars, belonging to the family Echinarachniidae . 

Species of Echinarachnius have been around since the Pliocene epoch.

Species
†Echinarachnius alaskensis Durham, 1957
Echinarachnius asiaticus Michelin, 1859
†Echinarachnius humilis Nisiyama, 1968
†Echinarachnius kewi Grant & Eaton in Eaton, Grant & Allen, 1941
†Echinarachnius naganoensis Morishita, 1953
Echinarachnius parma (Lamarck, 1816)
†Echinarachnius rumoensis Hayasaka & Shibata, 1952
†Echinarachnius subtumidus Nisiyama & Hashimoto, 1950

References

External links
 J.E. (1825). An attempt to divide the Echinida, or Sea Eggs, into natural families. Annals of Philosophy, new series. 10:423-431
 Pomel, A. 1883. Classification méthodique et Genera des Échinides vivantes et fossiles. Thèses présentées à la Faculté des Sciences de Paris pour obtenir le Grade de Docteur ès Sciences Naturelles 503, Adolphe Jourdan, Alger, 131 pp
  Neave, Sheffield Airey. (1939-1996). Nomenclator Zoologicus vol. 1-10 Online. [developed by uBio, hosted online at MBLWHOI Library 

Clypeasteroida
Echinoidea genera